David Webb may refer to:

Politics and activism
 David Webb (anti-censorship campaigner) (1931–2012), British actor and anti-censorship activist
 David Webb (Kansas politician) (born 1954), Kansas state legislator
 David Webb (Hong Kong activist) (born 1965), British-born corporate and economic governance activist in Hong Kong

Science
 D. A. Webb (David Allardice Webb, 1912–1994), Irish botanist
 David C. Webb (1928–2016), Irish-born philanthropist and aerospace consultant
 David Webb (pharmacologist) (born 1953), British pharmacologist
 David Webb (mathematician), American mathematician

Sports
 David Webb (rowing) (born 1943), British Olympic rowing coxswain
 David Webb (footballer) (born 1946), English footballer and manager
 David Webb (football manager), English football manager
 David Webb (runner) (born 1982), British marathon runner

Other
 David Webb (jeweler) (1925–1975), American jeweler
 David Webb (filmmaker) (born 1935), British filmmaker and caver
 Forest DLG (David L. G. Webb, born 1984), British music producer and DJ
 David Webb (character) or Jason Bourne, the title character of several Robert Ludlum and Eric Van Lustbader novels and the films based on them